Mary Barr Clay (October 13, 1839 – October 12, 1924) was a leader of the American women's suffrage movement. She also was known as Mary B. Clay and Mrs. J. Frank Herrick.

Family background
The elder daughter of Cassius Marcellus Clay and his wife Mary Jane Warfield, Mary Barr Clay was born on October 13, 1839, in Lexington, Kentucky. Clay married John Francis "Frank" Herrick, of Cleveland, Ohio, on October 3, 1866. The couple had three sons: Cassius Clay Herrick (July 17, 1867 – March 1935); Francis Warfield (February 9, 1869 – May 16, 1919); and, Green (August 11, 1871 – 10 Jan 1962). They divorced in 1872. She then dropped the Herrick name and took back her surname of Clay; she changed the last names of her two youngest children to Clay also.

In 1878, Clay's parents also divorced, leaving her mother Mary Jane Warfield Clay homeless after she had managed White Hall, the family estate, for 45 years. This inequality galvanized Clay into joining the women's rights movement, and she soon brought her three younger sisters with her. Laura Clay, the youngest, also became very active in the movement.

Public career
In May 1879, Mary B. Clay went to St. Louis, Missouri to attend the tenth anniversary of the National Woman Suffrage Association. She soon became a Kentucky delegate for that organization, serving as a vice-president. She was already a Vice President for the American Woman Suffrage Association. There she met Susan B. Anthony and arranged for the suffrage leader to speak in Richmond, Kentucky. Returning home she organized the Fayette County Equal Suffrage Association in 1879. The next year, she created the Madison County Equal Rights Association. While living in Ann Arbor, Michigan, to educate her two younger sons, she organized a suffrage club there. She became president pro tem of the convention in Flint for the Michigan State Suffrage Association.She also edited a column in the Ann Arbor "Register and spoke before the senior law class of the University of Michigan on the "Constitutional Right of Women to Vote." She submitted the Kentucky report in Volume 3 of the History of Woman Suffrage: 1876-1885.

Clay became the first Kentuckian to hold the office of president in a national woman's organization when she was elected president of the American Woman Suffrage Association in 1883. Mary B. Clay was also the first Kentucky woman to speak publicly on women's rights.

She corresponded with Susan B. Anthony, Lucy Stone, Alice Stone Blackwell and other leading suffragists. She is credited with drawing her younger sister Laura Clay into the women's rights movement. The younger Clay became better known in history as a women's rights advocate.

Death
Her public life largely ended in 1902, as she dealt with ill health and family obligations. Clay died on October 12, 1924, one day shy of her 85th birthday, and is interred at Lexington Cemetery.

See also
Clay family
American Woman Suffrage Association
National Woman Suffrage Association
Kentucky Equal Rights Association
National American Woman Suffrage Association

References

External links

Lexington Cemetery website 
Filson Historical Society

American suffragists
1839 births
1924 deaths
Green Clay family
American feminists
American women's rights activists
Women in Kentucky politics
Wikipedia articles incorporating text from A Woman of the Century
People from Lexington, Kentucky
Activists from Kentucky